Papa Babacar "Baba" Diawara (born 5 January 1988) is a Senegalese professional footballer who plays as a striker.

Club career

Marítimo
Born in Dakar, Diawara started his career with Senegal Premier League club ASC Jeanne d'Arc, moving to Europe aged just 19 to sign for C.S. Marítimo in Portugal due to his friendship with former footballer Paul Tisdale. Having risen to prominence in their reserves, he made his debut for the main squad late into the 2007–08 season, appearing in the second half of a 1–1 Primeira Liga home draw against C.F. Estrela da Amadora.

Promoted to the first team the following summer, Diawara scored ten goals in the 2008–09 campaign from 25 league games. His form attracted the attention of several clubs, including Sporting CP, Olympiacos F.C. from Greece and Scotland's Heart of Midlothian, with the latter however being put off by Marítimo's £2.5 million (€2.75 million) valuation of the player.

Diawara bettered his individual totals to 11 goals in 2010–11, with Marítimo finishing in ninth position. Celtic came close to signing him in August 2011, but the deal collapsed on the last day of the transfer window due to visa issues.

Diawara netted ten goals in only 15 matches in the first half of the 2011–12 season, including the last-minute winner at Sporting in a 3–2 win.

Sevilla
Diawara signed with Sevilla FC on 17 January 2012, penning a -year contract. He made his La Liga debut on the 29th, coming on as a substitute for José Antonio Reyes late into the first half of a 2–1 loss at Málaga CF. His first goal came on 3 March, starting the first time due to Álvaro Negredo's injury and equalising in a 1–1 draw against Atlético Madrid at the Ramón Sánchez Pizjuán Stadium. 

On 17 April 2012, Diawara scored the opening goal in the new National Stadium in Warsaw, during a friendly with local Legia Warsaw, adding another in a 2–0 win. He netted twice on 5 May as Sevilla won 5–2 in their final home match of the season, against Rayo Vallecano. In the following campaign he did not find the net, featuring mainly from the bench.

In July 2013, Diawara was one of three Sevilla players deemed surplus to requirements by coach Unai Emery. On 19 August, he was loaned to fellow Spaniards Levante UD for the duration of 2013–14.

Adelaide United
In February 2017, after one and a half seasons with former club Marítimo, Diawara joined Adelaide United FC in the Australian A-League. He scored three goals in only seven matches in his first season (five in all competitions), the first coming on 19 March in the 2–1 home defeat of Brisbane Roar FC.

Diawara agreed to a new two-year deal on 11 May 2017.

Mohun Bagan
In December 2019, Diawara signed a one-year contract with India's Mohun Bagan AC. He scored his first I-League goal for his new team the following 19 January, heading home from a corner kick in the 65th minute to help the hosts defeat East Bengal F.C. 2–1.

Punjab
Diawara joined Punjab FC of the same country and league on 1 February 2021. On his debut eight days later, he scored twice in a 2–1 away victory over Indian Arrows.

Club statistics

Honours
Mohun Bagan
I-League: 2019–20

References

External links

1988 births
Living people
Footballers from Dakar
Senegalese footballers
Association football forwards
ASC Jeanne d'Arc players
Primeira Liga players
Segunda Divisão players
C.S. Marítimo players
La Liga players
Sevilla FC players
Levante UD footballers
Getafe CF footballers
A-League Men players
Adelaide United FC players
Marquee players (A-League Men)
I-League players
Mohun Bagan AC players
Senegalese expatriate footballers
Expatriate footballers in Portugal
Expatriate footballers in Spain
Expatriate soccer players in Australia
Expatriate footballers in India
Senegalese expatriate sportspeople in Portugal
Senegalese expatriate sportspeople in Spain
Senegalese expatriate sportspeople in India